Lakkar Bazaar is a marketplace adjoining the Ridge in Shimla, India. Shops offer wooden articles targeted mainly at tourists. There is also a roller skating rink in Lakkar Bazaar. The state hospital known as Indira Gandhi Medical College and hospital is also adjoining to Lakkar Bazaar.

Lakkar Bazaar has many hotels including Hotel White and the Diplomat Hotel.

One must pass through Lakkar Bazaar while on way to Chapslee Estate, Longwood and Shankli, uptown residential localities of Shimla.

Lakkar Bazaar is known for wooden toys made by a small group of Sikh carpenters who settled there a century ago from Hoshiarpur. Wooden walking sticks are famous. Lakkar Bazar was like a small village in itself. Sita Ram is famous for its alloo tikki and chole Bhature. Regal Building, comprising a Cinema Hall, Roller Skating Hall and Meena Bazar is  a famous place.
There are few schools in the area providing primary and secondary education such as G.G.S.S. Lakkar Bazaar, D.A.V. School, Chapslee school. 
In terms of weather this region is a very cold place in winters and moderately warm in summers.

References

Buildings and structures in Shimla
Bazaars in India